Washoe or Washo may refer to:

 Washoe people, an indigenous peoples of the Great Basin in North America

Places
United States
 Washoe County, Nevada
 Washoe Creek, Sonoma County, California
 Washoe Lake, lake in Nevada
 Washoe Valley, Nevada, census-designated place
 Washoe Valley (Nevada)
 New Washoe City, Nevada

Culture
Washo language
 Washoe Tribe of Nevada and California, a federally recognized tribe of Washoe people

Other
 Washoe County School District, in Washoe County, Nevada
 Washoe (chimpanzee), a chimpanzee that received training in American Sign Language

See also
 Washoe County (disambiguation)